Robin Curtis (born in New York Mills, New York) is an American actress. She is best known for replacing Kirstie Alley in the role of Vulcan Lieutenant Saavik in the films Star Trek III: The Search for Spock and Star Trek IV: The Voyage Home.

Life and career

Film and television work
Although her first appearance as Vulcan Lieutenant Saavik in Star Trek III: The Search for Spock in 1984 was promoted as being her film debut, in fact, Curtis had already made several film and made-for-television movie appearances. Her performance in the film drew mixed reception from Trek fans and she reprised the role of Saavik for a brief appearance in Star Trek IV: The Voyage Home.

She co-starred in the 1983 episode "Short Notice" during the first season of the Knight Rider television series. In 1991, she portrayed Carol Pulaski on the soap opera General Hospital. In 1993, Curtis portrayed an unrelated Vulcan character disguised as a Romulan (Tallera/T'Paal) in the two-part episode of Star Trek: The Next Generation "Gambit". In the Babylon 5 episode "Deathwalker" (1994), she appeared as Abbai Ambassador Kalika.

She also appeared in the television series Dream On, Herman's Head,  Night Court, MacGyver, Johnny Bago, Seventh Heaven, and The Equalizer.

Curtis's other film work includes Hexed, Ghost Story, Shootdown, In Love with an Older Woman, A White Thread, A Black Thread, and LBJ - The Early Years in which she played the role of Jacqueline Kennedy.

In 2022 Curtis was cast in the horror film Awaken the Reaper, her first film role since 1999.

Stage and commercial work
Curtis has numerous stage credits in regional and national theatre, including Gyspy, Applause, Oliver!, ...And Other Songs in New York City. She performed in The City Suite Off Broadway and in Garden in Los Angeles. Other work includes The Nerd, The Man of La Mancha, and George Bernard Shaw's The Apple Tree. She has also appeared in several television commercials and infomercials.

Curtis made frequent appearances at Star Trek conventions in the mid-1990s but by 2014 was appearing only occasionally. She became a residential real estate agent in 2004 and the following year debuted her one-woman show, a work-in-progress, Not My Bra, You Don't! - The Sexual Odyssey of a Forty-Nine Year Old Woman.

Personal life
Curtis was briefly married to the actor Kent Williams.

Filmography

Television
Knight Rider (Season 1): Short Notice (1983) as Nicole Turner
MacGyver (Season 1): The Gauntlet (1985) as Kate Connelly
MacGyver (1985 TV series) (Season 2)
The Equalizer (1986 TV Series - Season 1) as Ginger Brock
LBJ: The Early Years (1987) as Jacqueline Kennedy
Night Court (Season 6) (1990) as Dr. Judith Malloy
General Hospital (1991) as Carol Pulaski
Herman's Head (1992) as Diane Shaw
Star Trek: The Next Generation (US TV Series) (1993) in "Gambit, Parts One And Two," as Tallera / T'Paal
Babylon 5 (US TV Series) (1994) as Ambassador Kalika
Space: Above and Beyond (US TV series) (1995) as Andrea Wilkins

References

External links
 
 
 Interview with Robin Curtis on the podcast The Future and You

Living people
20th-century American actresses
Actresses from New York (state)
American film actresses
American musical theatre actresses
American soap opera actresses
American television actresses
People from New York Mills, New York
American real estate brokers
State University of New York at Oswego alumni
21st-century American women
Year of birth missing (living people)